Sir Bruce Lovat Seton, 11th Baronet (29 May 1909 – 28 September 1969) was a British actor and soldier. He is best remembered for his eponymous lead role in Fabian of the Yard.

Early life
Bruce Lovat Seton was born in Simla, British India, the younger of two sons of Lieutenant-Colonel Sir Bruce Gordon Seton of Abercorn (1868–1934), 9th Baronet and his wife, Elma Armstrong (died 1960). He was educated at Edinburgh Academy and then trained at the Royal Military College, Sandhurst.

Military career 
Seton was commissioned into the Black Watch in 1929 as a second lieutenant, but resigned his commission in 1932. A brief interruption in his acting career came during the Second World War and in November 1939 he held the rank of captain in the 10th Battalion, Cameronians (Scottish Rifles), ending the war as major (temporary).  His service number was 44304 and he was awarded the Medal of Freedom.

Acting 
Seton began his acting career in the chorus line at Drury Lane Theatre and starred in Ralph Ince's film Blue Smoke (1935) as Don Chinko.

He played Inspector Fabian of Scotland Yard in the television series Fabian of the Yard (1954–1956). The series was based on the career of the former Scotland Yard Detective Inspector Robert Fabian, who usually appeared briefly before the final fade-out to wind up the story.

Seton's last role was as the voice of Beadle in The Wonderful World of Disney (1962–1963).

He fenced and boxed in the Army and was a founder member with other actors of the Lord's Taverners, a charity which raises funds to support participation in cricket.

Later career 
In 1963, on 7 February, the death of his brother, Alexander "Sandy" Hay Seton (who had no male heirs), Bruce became the 11th Seton baronet. As Bruce also had no male heirs at the time of his death, in 1969, the title passed to his cousin, Christopher Bruce Seton (1909–1988). His address in the 1940s was 15 Learmonth Gardens in western Edinburgh.

Personal life

He met fellow actor Tamara Desni Willhelm (1911–2008) on the set of Blue Smoke in 1935, became her second husband in 1937 in London and divorced in 1940.

He married his second wife, actress Antoinette Cellier (born Florence Antoinette Glossop Cellier). They had a daughter, Lydia Antoinette Gordon Seton (born 14 November 1941).

Selected filmography

 Flame in the Heather (1935) – Murray
 Blue Smoke (1935) – Don Chinko
 The Vandergilt Diamond Mystery (1936) – Hardcastle
 Wedding Group (1936) – Dr. Jock Carnegie
 The Demon Barber of Fleet Street (1936) – Mark
 Melody of My Heart (1936) – Jim Brent
 The End of the Road (1936) – Donald Carson
 Jack of All Trades (1936) – Dancer (uncredited)
 Love from a Stranger (1937) – Ronald Bruce
 Cafe Colette (1937) – Roger Manning
 Racing Romance (1937) – Harry Stone
 Fifty-Shilling Boxer (1937) – Jack Foster
 Father Steps Out (1937) – Johnnie Miller
 The Green Cockatoo (1937) – Madison – Tall Henchman
 Weddings Are Wonderful (1938) – John Smith
 You're the Doctor (1938) – Appleby
 Miracles Do Happen (1939) – Rodney Gilmore
 Annie Laurie (1939) – Jamie Turner
 Old Mother Riley Joins Up (1939) – Lt. Travers
 Lucky to Me (1939) – Lord 'Tiny' Tyneside
 Return to Yesterday (1940) – Journalist (uncredited)
 The Middle Watch (1940) – Captain Randall
 The Curse of the Wraydons (1946) – Jack Wraydon / Spring-Heeled Jack
 Bond Street (1948) – Sergeant
 The Story of Shirley Yorke (1948) – Captain Sharp
 Bonnie Prince Charlie (1948) – Allan Macrae (uncredited)
 Scott of the Antarctic (1948) – Lt. H. Pennell R.N.
 Look Before You Love (1948) – Johns
 Whisky Galore! (1949) – Sergeant Odd
 The Blue Lamp (1950) – PC Campbell
 Paul Temple's Triumph (1950) – Bill Bryant
 Seven Days to Noon (1950) – Brigadier Grant (uncredited)
 Portrait of Clare (1950) – Lord Steven Wolverbury
 Blackmailed (1951) – Supt. Crowe
 Worm's Eye View (1951) – Squadron Leader Briarly
 White Corridors (1951) – Policeman
 High Treason (1951)
 Take Me to Paris (1951) – Gerald Vane
 Emergency Call (1952) – Sgt. Bellamy
 The Second Mrs Tanqueray (1952) – Gordon Jayne
 The Cruel Sea (1953) – Tallow
 Mogambo (1953) – Wilson (uncredited)
 Eight O'Clock Walk (1954) – D. C. I.
 Doctor in the House (1954) – Police Driver (uncredited)
 Delayed Action (1954) – Sellars
 Man of the Moment (1955) – Fabian of the Yard (uncredited)
 Breakaway (1956) – Webb
 Morning Call (1957) – Inspector S.G. Brown
 There's Always a Thursday (1957) – James Pelly
 West of Suez (1957) – Major Osborne
 The Crooked Sky (1957) – Inspector 'Mac' Macauley
 Undercover Girl (1958) – Ted Austin
 The Heart of a Man (1959) – River Police Inspector (uncredited)
 Strictly Confidential (1959) – Inspector Shearing
 Make Mine a Million (1959) – Supt. James
 Violent Moment (1959) – Inspector Davis
 The 39 Steps (1959) – Policeman on Train (uncredited)
 John Paul Jones (1959) – 1st Villager
 Carry On Constable (1960) – (uncredited)
 Trouble with Eve (1960) – Col. Digby-Phillpotts
 Operation Cupid (1960) – Representative
 The League of Gentlemen (1960) – Patrolman (uncredited)
 Just Joe (1960) – Charlie
 Freedom to Die (1961) – Felix
 Gorgo (1961) – Prof. Flaherty
 Greyfriars Bobby: The True Story of a Dog (1961) – Prosecutor
 The Frightened City (1961) – Assistant Commissioner
 Ambush in Leopard Street (1962) – Nimmo
 The Pot Carriers (1962) – Prison Officer I / C Cell Block
 Dead Man's Evidence (1962) – Colonel James Somerset
 Dr. Syn, Alias the Scarecrow (1963) – Beadle

Honours
7 February 1963 Baronet, 11th baronet, of Abercorn (cr. 1663)
1947 Medal of Freedom

Arms

Sources
Burke's Peerage & Gentry, 107th edition

References

External links

Whirligig TV

Baronets in the Baronetage of Nova Scotia
British male film actors
British Army personnel of World War II
Black Watch officers
Cameronians officers
Graduates of the Royal Military College, Sandhurst
1909 births
1969 deaths
People educated at Edinburgh Academy
People from Shimla
British male television actors
20th-century British male actors
Bruce